Gong Qihuang (born 15 August 1964) is a Chinese opticist and educator who is a professor and currently president of Peking University.

Biography
Gong was born in Putian County (now Putian), Fujian, on 15 August 1964. He earned a bachelor's degree in 1983, a master's degree and a doctor's degree in 1989, all from Peking University. In 1988, he was sent to study at the University of Manchester on government scholarships. He carried out postdoctoral research at Peking University in 1989.

After graduating in 1991, he stayed at Peking University and worked successively as instructor, associate professor, and full professor. He was appointed deputy dean of the School of Physics in November 2009, becoming deputy director of Development Planning Department in March 2012, executive vice dean of Graduate School in July 2015 and director of Academic Committee of Peking University in March 2017. He moved up the ranks to become vice president in July 2017, executive vice president December 2019, and president in June 2022.

Honours and awards
 1997 Qiushi Outstanding Young Scholar Award
 2007 Fellow of the Institute of Physics (IOP)
 2010 Fellow of The Optical Society (OSA)
 2013 Member of the Chinese Academy of Sciences (CAS)
 2015 Member of the Chinese Optical Society (COS)
 2016 Science and Technology Progress Award of the Ho Leung Ho Lee Foundation 
 2018 Fellow of The World Academy of Sciences (TWAS)

References

1964 births
Living people
People from Putian
Scientists from Fujian
Peking University alumni
Alumni of the University of Manchester
Academic staff of Peking University
Presidents of Peking  University
Optical physicists
Members of the Chinese Academy of Sciences
TWAS fellows
Fellows of the Institute of Physics
Fellows of Optica (society)
Fellows of SPIE